This is a list of lists of ghost towns in the United States by state.

List of ghost towns in Alabama
List of ghost towns in Alaska
List of ghost towns in Arizona
List of ghost towns in Arkansas
List of ghost towns in California
List of ghost towns in Colorado
List of ghost towns in Connecticut
List of ghost towns in Delaware
List of ghost towns in Florida
List of ghost towns in Georgia
List of ghost towns in Hawaii
List of ghost towns in Idaho
List of ghost towns in Illinois
List of ghost towns in Indiana
List of ghost towns in Iowa
List of ghost towns in Kansas
List of ghost towns in Kentucky
List of ghost towns in Louisiana
List of ghost towns in Maine
List of ghost towns in Maryland
List of ghost towns in Massachusetts
List of ghost towns in Michigan
List of ghost towns in Minnesota
List of ghost towns in Mississippi
List of ghost towns in Missouri
List of ghost towns in Montana
List of ghost towns in Nebraska
List of ghost towns in Nevada
List of ghost towns in New Hampshire
List of ghost towns in New Jersey
List of ghost towns in New Mexico
List of ghost towns in New York
List of ghost towns in North Carolina
List of ghost towns in North Dakota
List of ghost towns in Ohio
List of ghost towns in Oklahoma
List of ghost towns in Oregon
List of ghost towns in Pennsylvania
List of ghost towns in Rhode Island
List of ghost towns in South Carolina
List of ghost towns in South Dakota
List of ghost towns in Tennessee
List of ghost towns in Texas
List of ghost towns in Utah
List of ghost towns in Vermont
List of ghost towns in Virginia
List of ghost towns in Washington
List of ghost towns in West Virginia
List of ghost towns in Wisconsin
List of ghost towns in Wyoming

See also

Dogpatch USA
Ghost Town in the Sky
Ghost Town, Oakland, California
Ghost town
List of ghost towns by country
List of flooded towns in the United States
Lists of ghost towns in Canada

External links
Ghosttowns.com
Alabama Ghost Towns DigitalAlabama.com
Unlocking the Past by Madeline DeJournett and Elfreda Cox (May 2007) ghost towns in Stoddard County, Missouri.
 Ghost towns of the American West
 Ghost town Gallery
 Lost America
 Monument Gallery
 Ghosttowns of the US at Rootsweb
Ghosttowns.de